La Sabana is one of the 7 villages to integrate the Caruao Parish in Vargas Municipality, Vargas State, Venezuela.

La Sabana is the hometown of the Kansas City Royals and Tiburones de La Guaira shortstop Alcides Escobar and Atlanta Braves outfielder Ronald Acuña Jr.

Notable people
 

Pedro María Morantes (1865–1918) lawyer, activist and novelist

References

Populated places in Vargas (state)